The San Domenico di Camerino Altarpiece is a 1482 tempera and gold on panel painting by Carlo Crivelli, probably originally painted in Camerino and now divided between the Pinacoteca di Brera, in Milan, the Stadel Museum, in Frankfurt, and the Abegg-Stockar Collection, in Zurich.

Bibliography (in Italian)
Pietro Zampetti, Carlo Crivelli, Nardini Editore, Firenze 1986. 
AA.VV., Brera, guida alla pinacoteca, Electa, Milano 2004. ISBN 978-88-370-2835-0

External links

Paintings by Carlo Crivelli
Paintings in the collection of the Pinacoteca di Brera
Paintings in the collection of the Städel
Paintings in Zürich (city)
1482 paintings
Paintings of the Madonna and Child
Paintings depicting Saint Peter
Paintings of Peter of Verona
Paintings depicting the Annunciation
Paintings of the Resurrection of Christ
Paintings of Saint Dominic